Gina Díaz-Ponce (28 September 1955 – 2016) was a Mexican professional tennis player.

Díaz-Ponce, a native of Yucatán, was a Federation Cup player for Mexico in 1973, featuring in ties against Austria and Great Britain. She was a singles and doubles gold medalist at the 1974 Central American and Caribbean Games.

References

External links
 
 

1955 births
2016 deaths
Mexican female tennis players
Competitors at the 1974 Central American and Caribbean Games
Central American and Caribbean Games medalists in tennis
Central American and Caribbean Games gold medalists for Mexico
Sportspeople from Yucatán (state)
20th-century Mexican women